Deurle is part of the municipality of Sint-Martens-Latem located in the Flemish part of Belgium. Deurle is a picturesque small village near the borders of the river Lys and was added to Sint-Martens-Latem in 1977. Many well-known Flemish artists have lived in this village nested near a forest. Today, it is one of the best residential areas around Gent (Ghent), also counting numerous restaurants and bistros.

The village was first mentioned in 1114 as Durle, but artefacts from the Roman era have been discovered.

Notable people
Jenny Montigny (1875–1937), artist
Gustave De Smet (1877-1943), artist

Gallery

References

External links
 

Populated places in East Flanders
Sint-Martens-Latem